The Jamaican vireo (Vireo modestus) is a species of bird in the family Vireonidae. It is endemic to Jamaica. Its natural habitats are subtropical or tropical dry forest, subtropical or tropical moist lowland forest, subtropical or tropical moist montane forest, and heavily degraded former forest.

References

 Raffaele, Herbert; James Wiley, Orlando Garrido, Allan Keith & Janis Raffaele (2003) Birds of the West Indies, Christopher Helm, London.

Jamaican vireo
Endemic birds of Jamaica
Jamaican vireo
Jamaican vireo
Taxonomy articles created by Polbot